Mim Senior High School popularly known as Misec is a secondary educational institution in Ghana and operates as a co-educational, non-denominational, day and boarding located in Mim in the Asunafo North Municipal District in the Ahafo Region of Ghana. Its motto is 'Let Your Light Shine'.

The school runs courses in Business, Science, general arts, general agric, Home Economics and visual arts, leading to the award of a West African Senior School Certificate (WASSCE).

Notable alumni
Collins Dauda, politician

See also

 Education in Ghana
 List of schools in Ghana

References

Educational institutions established in 1969
Brong-Ahafo Region
High schools in Ghana
1969 establishments in England